Orville Pennant (born 16 March 1971) is a Jamaican cricketer. He played in three first-class matches for the Jamaican cricket team in 1993/94 and 1994/95.

See also
 List of Jamaican representative cricketers

References

External links
 

1971 births
Living people
Jamaican cricketers
Jamaica cricketers
People from Manchester Parish